Albert White may refer to:

 Albert White (basketball) (born 1977), American professional basketball player
 Albert White (diver) (1895–1982), American diver and Olympic gold medalist
 Albert White (VC) (1892–1917), English soldier, recipient of the Victoria Cross during World War I
 Albert B. White (1856–1941), governor of West Virginia
 Albert Scott White (1855–1931), lawyer and politician in New Brunswick, Canada
 Albert Smith White (1803–1864), Senator and U.S. Representative from Indiana
 Albert White (cyclist) (1890–1965), British silver medalist in cycling at the 1920 Summer Olympics
 Albert White (musician) (born 1942), American blues guitarist, singer and songwriter
 Albert White (cricketer) (1889–1965), English cricketer

See also
Al White (disambiguation)
Bert White (disambiguation)